The Australian Labor Party (South Australian Branch), commonly known as South Australian Labor, is the South Australian Branch of the Australian Labor Party, originally formed in 1891 as the United Labor Party of South Australia. It is one of two major parties in the bicameral Parliament of South Australia, the other being the Liberal Party of Australia (SA Division).

Since the 1970 election, marking the beginning of democratic proportional representation (one vote, one value) and ending decades of pro-rural electoral malapportionment known as the Playmander, Labor have won 11 of the 15 elections. Spanning 16 years and 4 terms, Labor was last in government from the 2002 election until the 2018 election. Jay Weatherill led the Labor government since a 2011 leadership change from Mike Rann. During 2013 it became the longest-serving state Labor government in South Australian history, and in addition went on to win a fourth four-year term at the 2014 election. After losing the 2018 election, the party spent 4 years in opposition before leader Peter Malinauskas led the party to a majority victory in the 2022 election. 

Labor's most notable historic Premiers of South Australia include Thomas Price in the 1900s, Don Dunstan in the 1970s, John Bannon in the 1980s, and Mike Rann in the 2000s.

Formation

A United Trades and Labor Council meeting with the purpose of creating an elections committee was convened on 12 December 1890, and held on 7 January 1891. The elections committee was formed, officially named the United Labor Party of South Australia (unlike state Labor, prior to 1912 their federal counterparts included the 'u' in their spelling of Labour) with John McPherson the founding secretary. Four months later, Labor enjoyed immediate success, electing David Charleston, Robert Guthrie and Andrew Kirkpatrick to the South Australian Legislative Council. A week later, Richard Hooper won the 1891 Wallaroo by-election as an Independent Labor member in the South Australian House of Assembly. McPherson won the 1892 East Adelaide by-election on 23 January, becoming the first official Labor leader and member of the House of Assembly.

Prior to party creation, South Australian politics had lacked parties or solid groupings, although loose liberal and conservative blocs had begun to develop by the end of the 1880s. The 1893 election was the first general election Labor would stand at, resulting in liberal and conservative leaning MPs beginning to divide, additionally with unidentified groupings and independents, as well as the subsequent formation of the staunchly anti-Labor National Defence League. The voluntary turnout rate increased from 53 to 68 percent, with Labor on 19 percent of the vote, and 10 Labor candidates including McPherson and Hooper were elected to the 54-member House of Assembly which gave Labor the balance of power. The Kingston liberal government was formed with the support of Labor, ousting the Downer conservative government. Kingston served as Premier for a then-record of six and a half years, usually implementing legislation with Labor support.

Thomas Price formed the state's first Labor minority government and the world's first stable Labor Party government at the 1905 election with the support of several non-Labor MPs to form the Price-Peake administration, which was re-elected at the 1906 double dissolution election, with Labor falling just two seats short of a majority. So successful, John Verran led Labor to form the state's first of many majority governments at the 1910 election, just two weeks after the 1910 federal election where their federal counterparts formed Australia's first elected majority in either house in the Parliament of Australia, the world's first Labor Party majority government at a national level, and after the 1904 Chris Watson minority government the world's second Labor Party government at a national level.

Known as the United Labor Party of South Australia until 1917, the Australian Labor Party at both a state/colony and federal level pre-dates, among others, both the British Labour Party and the New Zealand Labour Party in party formation, government, and policy implementation.

Premiers

Thirteen of the nineteen parliamentary Labor leaders have served as Premier of South Australia: Thomas Price (1905–1909), John Verran (1910–1912), Crawford Vaughan (1915–1917), John Gunn (1924–1926), Lionel Hill (1926–1927 and 1930–1931; expelled from party but continued as Premier until 1933), Frank Walsh (1965–1967), Don Dunstan (1967–1968 and 1970–1979), Des Corcoran (1979), John Bannon (1982–1992), Lynn Arnold (1992–1993), Mike Rann (2002–2011), Jay Weatherill (2011–2018) and Peter Malinauskas (2022–Present) . Robert Richards was Premier in 1933 while leading the rebel Parliamentary Labor Party of MPs who had been expelled in the 1931 Labor split; he would later be readmitted and lead the party in opposition. Bannon is Labor's longest-serving Premier of South Australia, ahead of Rann and Dunstan by a matter of weeks. Every Labor leader for more than half a century has gone on to serve as Premier.

Deputy Premiers
Since the position's formal introduction in 1968, seven parliamentary Labor deputy leaders have served as Deputy Premier of South Australia: Des Corcoran (1968 and 1970–1979), Hugh Hudson (1979), Jack Wright (1982–1985), Don Hopgood (1985–1992), Frank Blevins (1992–1993), Kevin Foley (2002–2011), John Rau (2011–18) and Susan Close (2022– Present). Foley is the state's longest-serving Deputy Premier.

List of parliamentary leaders
 John McPherson (1892–1897)
 Lee Batchelor (1897–1899)
 Thomas Price (1899–1909)
 John Verran (1909–1913)
 Crawford Vaughan (1913–1917)
 Andrew Kirkpatrick (1917–1918)
 John Gunn (1918–1926)
 Lionel Hill (1926–1931)
 Edgar Dawes (1931–1933)
 Andrew Lacey (1933–1938)
 Robert Richards (1938–1949)
 Mick O'Halloran (1949–1960)
 Frank Walsh (1960–1967)
 Don Dunstan (1967–1979)
 Des Corcoran (1979)
 John Bannon (1979–1992)
 Lynn Arnold (1992–1994)
 Mike Rann (1994–2011)
 Jay Weatherill (2011–2018)
 Peter Malinauskas (2018–present)

List of deputy parliamentary leaders
 Robert Richards (1933–1938)
 Andrew Lacey (1938–1946)
 Mick O'Halloran (1946–1949)
 Frank Walsh (1949–1960)
 Cyril Hutchens (1960–1967)
 Des Corcoran (1967–1979)
 Hugh Hudson (1979)
 Jack Wright (1979–1985)
 Dr. Don Hopgood (1985–1992)
 Frank Blevins (1992–1993)
 Mike Rann (1993–1994)
 Ralph Clarke (1994–1996)
 Annette Hurley (1997–2002)
 Kevin Foley (2002–2011)
 John Rau (2011–2018)
 Susan Close (2018–present)

Current federal parliamentarians

Lower
 Matt Burnell – Spence MP since 2022
 Mark Butler – Hindmarsh MP since 2019, previously Port Adelaide MP from 2007 to 2019.
 Steve Georganas – Adelaide MP since 2019, previously Hindmarsh MP from 2004 to 2013 and again from 2016 to 2019.
 Louise Miller-Frost – Boothby MP since 2022
 Amanda Rishworth – Kingston MP since 2007
 Tony Zappia – Makin MP since 2007

Upper
 Don Farrell – Senator since 2016
 Karen Grogan – Senator since 2021
 Marielle Smith – Senator since 2019
 Penny Wong – Senator since 2002

Historic party officials
 Elizabeth Rose Hanretty

State election results

Note: Following the 2014 election, the Labor minority government won the 2014 Fisher by-election which took them to 24 of 47 seats and therefore majority government. Prior to the 2018 election, a Labor MP became an independent, reducing them back to a minority 23 seats.

See also
 Candidates of the 2022 South Australian state 
Members of the South Australian House of Assembly, 2018–2022
 Members of the South Australian Legislative Council, 2018–2022
 Liberal Party of Australia (South Australian Division)
 Playmander, the 1936−1968 electoral malapportionment
 Rann Government
 2018 South Australian state election
 2022 South Australian state election
 List of elections in South Australia

References

South Australia
Australian labour movement
Political parties in South Australia
1891 establishments in Australia
Political parties established in 1891